Aaron of Cardena was a Spanish cabalist, about whose life little is known. He wrote a book containing "profound secrets" under the title of Ḳarnayim ("Rays")—see Hab. iii. 4. The work was erroneously ascribed to Isaac b. Abraham b. David, surnamed "the Blind", which fact shows the esteem in which it was held and also the age in which it was written.

The author refers at the close of chap. iii. and at the beginning of chaps. v. and vii. to two of his other works, Kitro Yeshu'ah ("His Crown is Salvation" — compare Psalm xxxiii. 16), and Peraḥ Ẓiẓ ("The Blossom of the Priestly Diadem" — compare Num. xvii. 23), the titles of which seem to refer to his name, Aaron, as priest.

The work Ḳarnayim was first published at Zolkiev, in 1709, together with a commentary, Dan Yadin, by R. Simon b. Pesaḥ of Astropol, and additions by his nephew, under the title of Liḳḳuṭe Shoshanim. In 1805 it was republished at Jitomir together with the commentary Parashat Eliezer, by Eliezer Fishel, grandson of R. Isaac of Cracow, and in 1835 it was again published at Leghorn together with the commentary Ḳeren Ẓebi and another work, Peraḥ Shoshan, by Samuel b. Joseph Shamama.

References

18th-century Spanish people
Spanish Jews
Kabbalists